Patagioenas is a genus of New World pigeons whose distinctness from the genus Columba was long disputed but ultimately confirmed. It is basal to the Columba-Streptopelia radiation. Their ancestors diverged from that lineage probably over 8 million years ago. While the biogeographic pattern of this group suggests that the ancestors of the typical pigeons and turtle-doves settled the Old World from the Americas, Patagioenas may just as well be the offspring of Old World pigeons which only radiated into different genera later, given that the cuckoo-doves (Macropygia) of Southeast Asia also seem to be closely related.

Taxonomy
The genus Patagioenas was introduced by the German naturalist Ludwig Reichenbach in 1853 with the white-crowned pigeon (Patagioenas leucocephala) as the type species. The genus name combines the Ancient Greek patageō meaning "to clatter" and oinas meaning "pigeon". 

There are 17 species of Patagioenas, which can be assigned to 4 groups based on mtDNA cytochrome b, cytochrome c oxidase subunit I, and NADH dehydrogenase subunit 2, as well as the nuclear β-fibrinogen intron 7 data combined with analyses of vocalizations and morphology. They could be considered subgenera, but one of them remains unnamed as such and thus they are only informally listed here:

caribaea/band-tailed group (Chloroenas): Tails with terminal bands and iridescent neck; rows of low single coos. Apparently the most basal group.
 Band-tailed pigeon, Patagioenas fasciata
 Chilean pigeon, Patagioenas araucana
 Ring-tailed pigeon, Patagioenas caribaea

leucocephala group (Patagioenas sensu stricto): Iridescent neck and dark plumage, or white edged outer wing coverts, or scaly appearance; groups of triple coos with the first call in each drawn out except in speciosa
 White-crowned pigeon, Patagioenas leucocephala
 Scaly-naped pigeon, Patagioenas squamosa
 Scaled pigeon, Patagioenas speciosa
 Picazuro pigeon, Patagioenas picazuro
 Bare-eyed pigeon, Patagioenas corensis
 Spot-winged pigeon, Patagioenas maculosa

cayennensis group: No display plumage except iridescent head in cayennensis; groups of double or triple coos with the first call in each short
 Pale-vented pigeon, Patagioenas cayennensis
 Red-billed pigeon, Patagioenas flavirostris
 Maranon pigeon, Patagioenas oenops
 Plain pigeon, Patagioenas inornata

plumbea group (Oenoenas): Small size, plain plumage, rounded tails, small bills, phrase composed of high single coos
 Plumbeous pigeon, Patagioenas plumbea
 Ruddy pigeon, Patagioenas subvinacea
 Short-billed pigeon, Patagioenas nigrirostris
 Dusky pigeon, Patagioenas goodsoni

A fossil species (Curtis pigeon) initially placed in Chloroenas, Patagioenas micula (Early Pliocene of Curtis Ranch, USA) is known. A small member of this genus, it probably indeed belonged to the band-tailed group.

Footnotes

Sources

 Cheke, Anthony S. (2005). Naming segregates from the Columba–Streptopelia pigeons following DNA studies on phylogeny. Bull. B.O.C. 125(4): 293–295. PDF fulltext

 Mahler, Bettina & Tubaro, Pablo L. (2001). Relationship between song characters and morphology in New World pigeons. Biol. J. Linn. Soc. 74(4): 533–539.  (HTML abstract)

Further reading

 Couve, E. & Vidal, C. (2003): Aves de Patagonia, Tierra del Fuego y Península Antártica.  Editorial Fantástico Sur Birding Ltda.  

 
Bird genera

Taxa named by Ludwig Reichenbach